The 2001 South American Championships in Athletics were held at the Vila Olímpica in Manaus, Brazil, from May 18–20.

Medal summary

Men's events

Women's events

Medal table

Participation

 (34)
 (5)
 (77)
 (23)
 (10)
 (16)
 (1) (guest)
 (3)
 (1)
 (1)
 (7)
 (2)
 (9)
 (28)

See also
2001 in athletics (track and field)

References

External links
 Men Results – GBR Athletics
 Women Results – GBR Athletics
 Full results

S
South American Championships in Athletics
A
2001 in South American sport
International athletics competitions hosted by Brazil
2001 in Brazilian sport
May 2001 sports events in South America